Kamal Chunchie was a Methodist Christian minister who was born in 1886 and died in 1953. 

Kamal Chunchie was born in Sri Lanka and by 1920 was living in the East End of London. He was appalled by the way black people were treated, and he wanted to improve the social aspects of their lives. He worked in race relations in Canning Town where he founded The Coloured Men's Institute.

References

External links
 Kamal Chunchie - Photos of a hidden East End
 Kamal Chuncie with children
 Kamal Chuncie

1886 births
1953 deaths
Black British religious leaders
People from Canning Town
People from Kandy
English Methodist ministers
English people of Sri Lankan descent